André Pereira may refer to:

Sportspeople
André Pereira (swimmer) (born 1993), Brazilian swimmer
Andre Pereira da Silva (born 1980), Brazilian distance runner at the 1999 South American Cross Country Championships
André Pereira (basketball) (born 1979), Brazilian basketball player at the 2003 Pan American Games
André Pereira (footballer), Portuguese football forward
Andre Pereira (snowboarder), Brazilian snowboarder at the 2014 Winter Paralympics
André Pereira (steeplechase runner) (born 1995), Portuguese steeplechase runner and competitor at the 2015 European U23 Championships

Others
André Pereira dos Reis, 17th-century Portuguese captain, pilot, and cartographer
André Ferreira Pereira, 16th-century governor of Angola